Hampton Court is a small district on the eastern tip of St. Thomas, the most easterly parish on the Island of Jamaica. Hampton Court lies east of Golden Grove, west of Duckenfield, west of Dalvey and north of Rocky Point. It is the home of the Isaac Barrant Clinic and the Duckenfield Primary School. Overlooking Hampton Court is a historic location called Duppy House.

Geography of Saint Thomas Parish, Jamaica